Nelson Crispín Corzo (born 10 May 1992) is a Colombian Paralympic swimmer. He represented Colombia at the Summer Paralympics in 2012, 2016 and 2020. He won seven medals in total: one gold medal, five silver medals and one bronze medal.

Career
In 2016, he won the silver medal in the men's 50 metre freestyle S6, the men's 100 metre freestyle S6 and the men's 100 metre breaststroke SB6 events. He was also the flag bearer in the opening ceremony of the 2016 Summer Paralympics.

He represented Colombia at both the 2015 Parapan American Games and the 2019 Parapan American Games. He also competed at the 2019 World Para Swimming Championships held in London, United Kingdom.

Notes

References

External links 
 
 Nelson Crispin - Montreal 2013 IPC Swimming World Championships at the International Paralympic Committee

1992 births
Living people
People from Bucaramanga
Colombian male swimmers
Paralympic swimmers of Colombia
Paralympic gold medalists for Colombia
Paralympic silver medalists for Colombia
Paralympic bronze medalists for Colombia
Swimmers at the 2012 Summer Paralympics
Swimmers at the 2016 Summer Paralympics
Swimmers at the 2020 Summer Paralympics
Medalists at the 2016 Summer Paralympics
Medalists at the 2020 Summer Paralympics
Medalists at the World Para Swimming Championships
Paralympic medalists in swimming
Medalists at the 2011 Parapan American Games
Medalists at the 2015 Parapan American Games
Medalists at the 2019 Parapan American Games
S6-classified Paralympic swimmers
Sportspeople from Santander Department
21st-century Colombian people